Jovino Santos Neto (born September 18, 1954) is a Seattle-based Brazilian-American jazz pianist, flutist, composer, arranger, educator and record producer.

Career
Jovino Santos Neto started playing piano at age 13 and by 16 was playing keyboards in a band called the Vacancy Group in Bangu, Rio de Janeiro. He earned a degree in Biology, from the Federal University of Rio de Janeiro, and later from Macdonald College of McGill University in Montreal, Quebec, Canada.

In 1977, he joined the group led by Brazilian composer Hermeto Pascoal, working as a pianist, flutist, composer, arranger and producer. Since leaving Hermeto's group in 1992 and relocating to the United States, Santos Neto has released several albums. He has toured internationally as the leader of his own ensemble and with musicians such as Airto Moreira, Flora Purim, and Mike Marshall.

Santos Neto teaches at Seattle's Cornish College of the Arts and is a frequent teacher at Jazz Camp West.

Discography

 1998:  Caboclo
 2000:  Ao Vivo em Olympia (Live in Olympia, Washington)
 2001:  Balaio (Basket)  (Malandro)
 2003:  Canto do Rio
 2003:  Serenata with Mike Marshall
 2005:  Brazil Duets with Mike Marshall
 2006:  Roda Carioca
 2008:  Alma do Nordeste (Soul of the Northeast)
 2010:  Veja o Som
 2011:  Current

Awards
 Artist Trust Fellowship, 2001
 IAJE/ASCAP (International Association for Jazz Education/American Society of Composers, Authors and Publishers Commission) for an established composer, 2002
 Chamber Music America New Works Jazz Composition Award, 2003
 Northwest Jazz Instrumentalist of the Year, Earshot Jazz, 2004
 Nomination, Best Latin Jazz Album, Canto do Rio, Latin Grammy Awards, 2004
 Nomination, Best Latin Jazz Album, Roda Carioca, Latin Grammy Awards, 2006
 Nomination, Best Instrumental Album Live at Caramoor,  Latin Grammy Awards, 2009

References

External links
Official website
'Ep. 138: Jovino Santos Neto - pianist, composer, arranger, educator' Interview by Tigran Arakelyan

1954 births
Living people
21st-century pianists
Musicians from Rio de Janeiro (city)
Brazilian jazz pianists
Brazilian jazz composers
Brazilian music arrangers
Brazilian music educators
Brazilian record producers
Melodica players
Jazz flautists
Malandro Records artists
McGill University Faculty of Agricultural and Environmental Sciences alumni
Federal University of Rio de Janeiro alumni
Cornish College of the Arts faculty
Brazilian expatriates in the United States
American people of Brazilian descent
21st-century flautists